The Prochloraceae are a family of cyanobacteria.

References

Synechococcales
Cyanobacteria families